Tucker Smallwood (born February 22, 1944) is an American actor, author, and vocalist.

Early life
From 1967 to 1970, Smallwood served in the United States Army Airborne Infantry. Commanding a Mobile Advisory Team during the Vietnam War, he was nearly fatally wounded in action and pronounced dead, in 1969. After recovering from the injuries, Smallwood moved to New York City where he studied acting at the Neighborhood Playhouse and established a career as a performer in Broadway productions (Mahalia), films and television.

Career
His films include The Cotton Club (1984), Contact (1997), Deep Impact (1998), Larry David's Sour Grapes, Traffic (2000), The One (2001), Quigley (2003), Spectres (2004) and Embers (2015). On television, he has been a regular and made guest appearances on many series, including Space: Above and Beyond, Millennium, Babylon 5, The X-Files, Curb Your Enthusiasm, Seinfeld, Murphy Brown, Star Trek: Voyager, Star Trek: Enterprise, Friends and The Sarah Silverman Program.

He often plays military characters, and as a science fiction fan, he always longed to play a Star Trek alien. He came close on Voyager when he played the human form of a disguised alien, but it was not until Enterprise that he played a fully alien character, a sympathetic Xindi, for several episodes.

Smallwood sometimes sings in his acting roles. He plays his guitar on several occasions on Space: Above and Beyond, as Commodore Ross. His character on Millennium sang to people before euthanizing them. He is the vocalist in the blues band Incarnation led by bassist Jerry Jemmott. Their self-titled first album, produced in 1994 at Clark Dimond's Dimond Studio in the Sangre de Cristo Mountains, is a tribute to the music of Delta Blues King Robert Johnson with 15 tracks written by or associated with Johnson. It was actually recorded in 1981 at Greene St. Recording featuring guitarist Arlen Roth. They were joined by Pat Conte on Guitar and T C James on piano with Herb Lovelle on drums.

Smallwood was one of the two actors in Bruce Nauman's video installation, "Good Boy Bad Boy" (1985).

He is the author of Return To Eden, anthology of 33 personal essays describing his tour of duty in the Vietnam War, his life as performer and his return to Vietnam in 2004. Some of these essays previously appeared in magazines. In 2006, the mp3 version of Return to Eden was first runner-up in the audio/spoken word category at the Fifth Annual DIY Book Festival, which celebrates independent authors and publishers. In 2009, he hosted the hybrid television radio horror anthology series As Darkness Falls.

Filmography

Film

Television

Video games

References

External links
Tucker Smallwood's official site

1944 births
Living people
American male film actors
United States Army soldiers
African-American male actors
American male television actors
United States Army personnel of the Vietnam War
Male actors from Washington, D.C.
Military personnel from Washington, D.C.
20th-century African-American people
21st-century African-American people